Colandia was a kind of vessel, which was used by Early Chola. Chola used two varieties of vessels. The first kind, known as the Sangara, including vessels both large and small. The second variety, called Colandia, were very large in size and these types of vessels were used for voyages to the Ganges and the Chryse, which was the name of various places occurring in Ancient Greek geography. Also, the Chola had voyages from the ancient port Puhar to Pacific Islands.

Another theory suggest that kolandiaphonta (also known as kolandiapha or kolandiapha onta) was a transcription of the Chinese term Kun-lun po, which refers to an Indonesian vessel. The Sangara is likely to have been derived from Indonesian twin-hulled vessels similar to Pacific catamarans.

See also 

 Ajanta caves boats
 Borobudur ship
 Junk (ship)
 Jong (ship)
 K'un-lun po

References

External links 
 Ancient history of India

Chola Empire
Chola dynasty
Sailboat types
Ship types
Merchant ships